The 1967 Iowa Hawkeyes football team represented the University of Iowa in the 1967 Big Ten Conference football season. Led by second-year head coach Ray Nagel, the Hawkeyes compiled an overall record of 1–8–1 with a mark of 0–6–1 in conference play, tying for ninth place in the Big Ten. The team played home games at Iowa Stadium in Iowa City, Iowa.

Schedule

This was the first season since 1952 that Iowa faced Illinois, following the chaos of their last matchup.

References

Iowa
Iowa Hawkeyes football seasons
Iowa Hawkeyes football